Land Legs is a 2015 French drama film written and directed by Samuel Collardey. It was screened at the 72nd Venice International Film Festival, where Dominique Leborne was awarded best actor in the Horizons section.

Plot

Cast   
 
     Dominique Leborne as Dom
     Mailys Leborne  as  Mailys 
     Matteo Leborne as Matteo
     Chantal Leborne as Dom's Mother
     Vincent Bessonnet  as  Vincent
     Patrick d'Assumçao  as The Shipowner
     Marc Brunet  as  The Banker

References

External links  

French drama films
2015 drama films
2015 films
2010s French films